Smith McLoud House is a historic home located at Middlesex in Yates County, New York. This Greek Revival–style structure was built about 1830 and features a five-by-two-bay rectangular rubble stone central block with molded cornice and wooden corner pilasters, bold frieze and trabeated entrance.

It was listed on the National Register of Historic Places in 1994.

References

Houses on the National Register of Historic Places in New York (state)
Greek Revival houses in New York (state)
Houses completed in 1830
Houses in Yates County, New York
1830 establishments in New York (state)
National Register of Historic Places in Yates County, New York